Gelechia rhombella, the apple groundling, is a moth of the family Gelechiidae. It is found in Europe, the Caucasus, Transcaucasia, southern Siberia, the Russian Far East, Korea and China (Gansu, Qinghai, Jilin).

The wingspan is 13–17 mm. 

The larvae feed on Malus species (including Malus domestica) and Pyrus communis.

References

Moths described in 1775
Gelechia
Moths of Europe